Marcus Harris may refer to:

Marcus Harris (wide receiver, born 1974), American football player
Marcus Harris (wide receiver, born 1989), American football player
Marcus Harris (cricketer) (born 1992), Australian cricketer
Marcus Harris, child actor in The Famous Five

See also
Mark Harris (disambiguation)